The Flying Phantom is a one-design catamaran capable of planing above the surface of the water due to curved daggerboards acting as hydrofoils. It is built by Phantom International, and is the boat used in the Red Bull Foiling Generation race series.

References

External links 
 https://web.archive.org/web/20140915062902/http://www.phantom-international.com/boats/flying-phantom/  Official web site

Catamarans
Hydrofoils